The municipal government of Winnipeg is represented by 15 city councillors and a mayor elected every four years.

Along with being the current provincial capital of Manitoba, Winnipeg has served as the capital for two other Canadian territories: the North-West Territories, from 1870 to 1876, and the District of Keewatin, from 1876 to 1905.

In the past, Winnipeg has garnered a reputation as the "gang capital" of Canada and, in 2013, the Canadian Police Association claimed that gangs were "a key and distinguishing feature of the urban landscape in Winnipeg." In 2019, there were an estimated 4,000 local gang members in Winnipeg—around 1,500 full members and 2,500 associates—spread out between 25-30 separate gangs.

From 2018 to 2019, the Winnipeg Census Metropolitan Area had the largest Crime Severity Index increase (+22) in the number of homicides in Canada overall. Moreover, two weeks before the end of 2019, Winnipeg broke its own record for the most homicides in a year, with 42 homicides. Winnipeg that year also dealt with rising violent property crimes. In 2017, Winnipeg had among the highest number (192) of police officers per capita among major Canadian cities (i.e., those with populations of 500,000 or more).

Scott Gillingham was elected as the 44th Mayor of the City of Winnipeg after a very tight race against Glen Murray, on October 26, 2022. Winnipeg is also represented in the Canadian House of Commons by eight Members of Parliament.

Politics

Early years 
Winnipeg officially became a city on 8 November 1873, with the passing of An Act to Incorporate the City of Winnipeg by the Manitoba Legislature. The Act would outline the essential powers for Winnipeg City Council, and provide a precise description of the City's boundaries (the city itself being 3 square miles at incorporation):

 Its southern and eastern boundaries were marked by the Assiniboine and Red Rivers
 Its western boundary was marked by present-day Maryland Street, Notre Dame Avenue, and McPhillips Street
 Its northern boundary was marked by Burrows Avenue, west of Main Street, and Aberdeen Avenue, east of Main Street.

With 4 city wards in total, Winnipeg's first civic election took place on 5 January 1874, for which voters had to be (1) male; (2) 21 years of age; (3) British subjects by birth or naturalization; (4) resident in the City at least 3 months prior to the election; and (5) own property valued at $100 or more, or pay at least $20 per year in rent. William Nassau Kennedy was the acting City Clerk and Registrar for the first election, and found that only 398 residents of the new City of Winnipeg met the qualifications to vote. With this election, Francis Evans Cornish became the first mayor of Winnipeg.

In 1887, civic suffrage was afforded to women in Winnipeg, 80 of whom would be eligible to vote in that year's civic election and 476 in the election of 1888.

Modern era 

Starting in 1900, in both provincial and federal elections, central Winnipeg elected politicians from the Labour Party.

While the norm in the city's early years was for local elected officials to be English Protestants, there were still exceptions who won elections: Arni Frederickson (Ward 5, 1891) and Arni Eggertson (Ward 4, 1906) were Icelandic; Moses Finkelstein and Altar Skaletar (Ward 5, 1912) were Jewish; and Theodore Stefanik (Ward 5, 1911) was the first Ukrainian elected to City Council.

Women would not able to hold office in Winnipeg until 1916, after which Alice A. Holling in 1917 (Ward 7) became the first woman to run for Council. (Holling lost to Alexander McLennan, 693 to 358.) In December 1920, Jessie Kirk became the first woman elected to Council. Kirk served a two-year term on Council for Ward 2, running again in 1922, 1923, 1926, and 1934, but was defeated each time.

From 15 May to 28 June in 1919, Winnipeg was the site of a general strike. There were violent protests during this strikes, several deaths at the hands of the Royal North-West Mounted Police, and the arrest of many of Winnipeg's future politicians. The unrest was adapted into a stage musical in 2005 called Strike!, itself being adapted into a 2019 film directed by Robert Adetuyi, titled Stand!. Though it was not chartered until 1932, the Co-operative Commonwealth Federation would be born out of the 1919 labour unrest, as well as out of the Depression. Its successor, the New Democratic Party, has enjoyed much support in Winnipeg since the early 1960s.
On July 27, 1971, the City of Winnipeg became a unicity by amalgamating the Town of Tuxedo; the rural municipalities of Charleswood, Fort Garry, North Kildonan, Old Kildonan; the cities of East Kildonan, West Kildonan, St. Vital, Transcona, St. Boniface, St. James-Assiniboia; the old City of Winnipeg; and the Metropolitan Corporation of Greater Winnipeg.

The first election for the newly combined city was held on 6 October 1971. The City Council consisted of 50 councillors and one mayor. The councillors were elected on the basis of one councillor per city ward while the mayor was elected by the city-at-large. The term of office was three years. The inaugural meeting of the new council took place on 4 January 1972. Since 50 councillors proved too unwieldy, the city wards were reduced to 29 in 1977. In 1992, the city wards were reduced even further to the present 15 and city councillors became full-time politicians.

On 22 June 2004, Sam Katz was elected as the first Jewish mayor of Winnipeg. He beat out prominent politicians Dan Vandal, Al Golden, and MaryAnn Mihychuk for the job by receiving 42.51% of the vote. This came after the resignation of Glen Murray as mayor of Winnipeg to run in the 2004 federal election. Katz was re-elected to a second term in the 2006 elections on 25 October 2006. After promising in his first election to run for only two terms, Katz ran for a third term in 2010. He was re-elected in the 2010 elections. Brian Bowman, the City's first Indigenous mayor, was elected as the 43rd Mayor of the City of Winnipeg in a landslide victory on 22 October 2014.

Winnipeg is represented in the Canadian House of Commons by eight Members of Parliament: , the eight include four from the Liberal Party, two from the Conservative Party, and two from the New Democratic Party. Winnipeg's longest-serving Members of Parliament include J.S. Woodsworth (21 years), Stanley Knowles (38 years), David Orlikow (25 years), Bill Blaikie (almost 27 years and re-elected in the 2006 federal election), and Lloyd Axworthy (21 years).

Winnipeg City Hall 

Winnipeg City Hall is the municipal government complex and seat of municipal government of Winnipeg.

Built in 1962–63 and officially opened in 1964, the current City Hall of Winnipeg (also known as Winnipeg Civic Centre) is the third municipal administrative facilities to exist for the city. The Civic Centre includes four buildings that were completed in 1964:

 The two individual buildings of City Hall, along with a courtyard in between:
 the Council Building, for Winnipeg City Council; and 
 the Susan A. Thompson Building, for administrative works (formerly called the Administrative Building)
 Public Safety Building — former Winnipeg Police headquarters and remand centre
 Civic Parkade

The Council and Administrative Buildings are joined by an underground corridor, which also connects the Civic Centre to the Manitoba Centennial Centre.

First Hall (1876–83) 
During the initial two years of the city's incorporation in November 1873, city council meetings were held in various buildings in Winnipeg, including a furniture store.

Winnipeg's first City Hall (1876–83) was built for CA$40,000 in 1876, three years after the city was incorporated, and was located on Main Street between William and Market Avenues. Commencing in 1875, the building was constructed by Robert Dewar on top of a creek that was filled-in for that purpose.

The placing of the cornerstone of the city hall on 17 August 1875 was celebrated as a "grand civic holiday," with a large procession down Main Street to the ritual of laying the cornerstone. In the cornerstone, a casket (or time capsule) was deposited, containing coins, bills, newspapers, and photographs of the City.

The building was formally opened in March 1876 with a concert in aid of the Winnipeg General Hospital. During these early years, the hall served as a multi-use building. Developing cracks in its walls shortly after it was erected along with other structural flaws for which wooden poles had to be used to prop it up, the building was demolished in 1883.

Second Hall (1886–1962) 

During the construction of the second hall (1884–86), the Mayor and City Council took up residence at 238 King Street in the newly-built Coronation Block, which served as an interim “City Hall” between 1883 and 1886. (Eventually needing repairs and becoming a public safety hazard itself, the Coronation Block building was demolished in 2012.) In July 1884, the cornerstone for the second City Hall was laid. This new building, designed by architectural firm Barber and Barber, had a Victorian, Queen Anne Revival style.

The second Hall not only served the city government throughout its years, it also provided residence for the city's Board of Trade, the Historical and Scientific Society of Manitoba's library and reading room, and club rooms of the St. George's and St. Andrew's Societies. The building lasted just under 80 years, being demolished in 1962. While its replacement was initially planned for construction around 1913, the First World War would get in the way of these plans and not resurface until the late 1950s.

Third Hall (1964–present) 
When planning for Winnipeg's third city hall, City Council considered various different sites in and around the core downtown area. However, they would eventually decide to remain in the Exchange District, the city's traditional central business district, adjacent to Old Market Square.

With a modernist, International style, the current City Hall was built in 1962–63 for $8.2 million—the style symbolizing upcoming centennial celebrations: the 1967 Canadian Centennial, the 1970 Manitoba centennial, and the 1973 Winnipeg centennial. The building's cornerstone was laid by Stephen Juba, Winnipeg's first “immigrant” mayor, and it was officially opened on 5 October 1964.

The Civic Centre and the Manitoba Centennial Centre were connected by tunnels in 1967. From 2015 to 2017, the two buildings went through $5.4 million in renovations. Its administration building was renamed the Susan A. Thompson Building to recognize the titular first female mayor of Winnipeg, who held office from 1992 to 1998.

In the inner courtyard of City Hall, which was refurbished in 2003, are ceramic crests of each of the rural municipalities that were amalgamated into the City of Winnipeg in 1972. Commemorating the second City Hall is a Historic Winnipeg plaque found behind the City Hall sign near the northwest corner of the Council Building of the current City Hall.

The current Hall consists of two individual buildings: one for Winnipeg City Council and the other for administrative works, both joined by an underground corridor. Faced with Tyndall stone and Quebec Granite, the two buildings feature a bronze frame, screen, and hardware elements; with public-area interior wall finishes being limestone, granite, brick, and plaster.

The dedication to the City Hall, dedicated during the official opening ceremony for the City Hall on 5 October 1964, is inscribed into the west wall of the Council Building lobby. The Council Building, located on Princess Street, contains:

 Council Chamber
 Public Gallery, with a maximum capacity of 250 people
 Committee Rooms
 the Office of the Mayor
 Councillor offices
 the City Clerk's Department
 the Creative Services Branch of the Internal Services Department
 the Emergency Operations office

The Administration Building, (now called the Susan A. Thompson Building), is seven-stories high and houses:

 office of the Chief Administrative Officer
 office of the Corporate Services and Corporate Finance Departments
 conference rooms
 a public restaurant

Law enforcement and military

Winnipeg is policed by the Winnipeg Police Service (WPS), which in 2012, had 1,442 police officers. Prior to 2014, Winnipeg Police were headquartered at the Public Safety Building in Winnipeg's Exchange District.

In February 1874, John S. Ingram became Winnipeg's first Chief of Police. Failing to control the City's rise in lawlessness, however, Ingram resigned in July 1875, and replaced by D. B. Murray.

In 2017, Winnipeg had 192 police officers per 100,000 people, being among the highest number of cops per capita among major Canadian cities (i.e., those with populations of 500,000 or more). However, this number would be down from 200 in 2015, a change consistent with an overall decline in police officers per capita across Canada, which saw a 1% drop last year and a 1% decline the year before.

The City of Winnipeg has five distinct police districts.

Military 
Winnipeg-based units/groups belonging to the Canadian Armed Forces include:

 12th Manitoba Dragoons
 CFB Winnipeg
 Queen's Own Cameron Highlanders of Canada
 Royal Winnipeg Rifles and the Winnipeg Light Infantry
 Winnipeg Grenadiers

Crime 
Between 2009 and 2019, overall crime in Winnipeg has dropped by 4%.

Violent crime 
In 2019, Winnipeg's Violent Crime Severity Index (VCSI) rating came to 173, against the national average of 82.44, ranking #13 out of a total 237.

Though the city experiences high rates of violent crime, Winnipeg has witnessed a general decreasing trend in the frequency of these crimes. For example, the assault rate has dropped every year since 2009, from 953.4 per 100,000 residents to 810.9 in 2012. Although this rate is still not as low as the number recorded in 2007 (781.1), it is substantially lower than the years of 1996 to 2002, when the average rate was 1049.8 per 100,000 residents. The robbery rate has also decreased over time, peaking in 2009 at 346.7. In 2012, the robbery rate was at either 250.1 or 272.9, as there were discrepancies between the numbers of the annual crime report (1,660 robberies reported) and of CrimeStat (1,811). Either rate was nonetheless several times higher than the national average of 79.4, though it would be a decrease from 2009 (346.7) and 2007 (781.1). The Winnipeg Transit system is a frequent place of violent crime including assaults on drivers and passengers, and the homicide of a transit driver in 2017.

The only rate that has increased is the homicide rate. From 1981 to 2012, Winnipeg had the highest murder rate among Canada's largest nine cities a total of sixteen times, with a rate of 6.2 per 100,000 residents. There were an additional 4 unlawful deaths, which would bring the rate to 6.8. This rate was around 4 times higher than the national rate (1.7 per capita). The next year, there were 30 known homicides in Winnipeg (4.5 per capita) with an addition 3 unlawful deaths (equating to a rate of 5.0), again being a few times higher than the national rate (1.6).

From 2018 to 2019, the Winnipeg Census Metropolitan Area had the largest VCSI increase (22) in the number of homicides in Canada overall. In November 2019, Winnipeg experienced an unprecedented 11 homicides in the span of 30 days. Two weeks before the end of 2019, Winnipeg broke its own record for the most homicides in a year, with 42 homicides. Of those 42, 36 were men or boys and six were women or girls; four were under age 18.

In 2020, gangs were a significant driving force of violence in Winnipeg—with 50% of all 110 shootings and 30% of all 41 homicides that year being gang related. By December that year, 86% of the homicide cases had been solved. Among the victims were more than 93 young Indigenous people (male and female) between the ages of 17 and 25 years old.

Property and nonviolent crime 
Drug-related offences in Canada are administered by the federal Controlled Drugs and Substances Act (CDSA). Criminal traffic violations are facilitated via the Criminal Code.

In 2019, in addition to a significant spike in homicides, violence, and child pornography, Winnipeg dealt with rising violent property crimes, exacerbated by a meth crisis. Contributing to that change was an increase in fraud, theft of $5,000 or under, and breaking & entering.

Crime severity index 
From 2018 to 2019, the Winnipeg Census Metropolitan Area had the largest Violent Crime Severity Index (VCSI) increase (22) in the number of homicides in Canada overall. In 2019, Winnipeg also dealt with rising violent property crimes. Driving that change was an increase in homicide, fraud, shoplifting of $5,000 or under, as well as breaking and entering, and child pornography.

Winnipeg ranked #13 out of 237 on Canada's VCSI in 2019, with a rating of 173 (the national average was 82.44). Its overall Crime Severity Index (CSI) rating came to 125, against the national average of 75.01. With an increase of 12% from the previous year, Winnipeg therefore saw the third largest increase in the 2019 CSI, tied with Thunder Bay, Ontario, but behind Victoria (20%) and Kelowna (13%), BC.

Among municipalities of Manitoba, Winnipeg still fell behind Thompson at #1 (CSI: 366; VCSI: 570), Portage la Prairie at #3 (CSI: 263; VCSI: 316), and Selkirk at #7 (CSI: 193; VCSI: 231).

Concentration of crime 

Despite high overall violent crime rates compared to other Canadian cities, crime in Winnipeg is very concentrated. For example, 80 of 234 neighbourhoods had not one robbery in 2012, and 32 others only had one robbery. However, there were 20 neighbourhoods (about 10% of neighbourhoods) that had higher robbery rates than the highest robbery rate in Toronto (Bay Street Corridor; 640 per 100,000 residents), such as Lord Selkirk Park with a rate of 4,395.6., or South Portage at 4,139.8.

The 20 neighbourhoods in Winnipeg with the highest robbery rates, all have boundaries that connect to each other, with a cumulative population of 54,255 in 2006: South Point Douglas, Logan - C.P.R., Lord Selkirk Park, South Portage, Portage - Ellice, Dufferin Industrial, Spence, Central Park, St. John's Park, William Whyte, West Alexander, North Point Douglas, Centennial, Colony, Chinatown, Dufferin, Daniel Mcintyre, St. John's, Portage & Main, and West Broadway In 2012, with 918 robberies (1692.9 per capita), this geographical cluster is where the majority of violent crime happened in Winnipeg. 918 of the 1,812 (50.7%) robberies in the city occurred in this area, where only 8.7% of the cities total population lives. From 2009 to 2013, 95 of the 145 (65.5%) homicides in Winnipeg occurred in this smaller portion of the city, creating an average homicide rate of 35.0 per 100,000 residents, peaking at 57.1 in 2011. If one were subtract these areas from the city, the homicide rate average in Winnipeg would substantially lower at 1.8 per 100,000 people, and the robbery rate in the city is over 1,000% lower at 156.7.

The two highest rankings are South Point Douglas (11,304.3) and Logan-C.P.R. (6,333.3) but both have lower populations under 1,000 residents. Lord Selkirk Park and South Portage compare to some of the most dangerous neighbourhoods in the USA, however no ranking is 100% certain as Canada and the USA have different classifications for crimes, (robbery is one though that both countries use the same), and there are also no recorded assault rates for Winnipeg neighbourhoods.

Crime by neighborhood (2017-2021)

The table below shows the crime rates of various crimes  of each population area of Winnipeg. The crime data spans 5 years from the year 2017 to the year 2021. The rates are crimes per 100,000 residents per year. For more narrow and specific data, there are two more tables below that show the crime rates for each individual neighborhood.

{| class="wikitable sortable mw-collapsible mw-collapsed"
|+Crime Rates per 100,000 people in Winnipeg Areas, 2017-2021
!Area
!Pop.
!Homicide
!Rate 
!Robbery
!Rate
!Agr. Aslt. 
!Rate
!Cmn. Aslt 
!Rate
!Utt. Threat 
!Rate
!Property
!Rate
|-
|North End
|12,060
|44
|73.0
|1,217
|2,018.2
|1,800
|2,985.1
|1,993
|3,305.1
|511
|847.4
|9,427
|15,633.5
|-
|Central
|11,625
|29
|49.9
|1,052
|1,809.9
|1,803
|3,101.9
|2,639
|4,540.2
|518
|891.2
|11,986
|20,621.1
|-
|West Central
|20,905
|33
|31.6
|1,251
|1,196.8
|1,538
|1,471.4
|2,043
|1,954.6
|366
|350.2
|12,928
|12,368.3
|-
|South West End
|13,185
|13
|19.7
|295
|447.5
|355
|538.5
|688
|1,043.6
|153
|232.1
|6,928
|10,508.9
|-
|St. John's
|11,435
|11
|19.2
|446
|780.1
|592
|1,035.4
|853
|1,491.9
|194
|339.3
|5,227
|9,142.1
|-
|Downtown
|8,995
|8
|17.8
|732
|1,627.6
|812
|1,805.4
|1,824
|4,055.6
|358
|796.0
|12,379
|27,524.2
|-
|Osborne-Corydon
|12,745
|8
|12.6
|221
|346.8
|212
|332.7
|395
|619.9
|99
|155.4
|5,715
|8,968.2
|-
|East Inkster
|7,660
|4
|10.4
|95
|248.0
|155
|404.7
|290
|757.2
|62
|161.9
|2,352
|6,141.0
|-
|Burrows
|14,930
|4
|5.4
|291
|389.8
|243
|325.5
|372
|498.3
|113
|151.4
|4,667
|6,251.8
|-
|Elmwood
|20,570
|5
|4.9
|351
|341.3
|439
|426.8
|830
|807.0
|239
|232.4
|7,532
|7,323.3
|-
|Weston
|9,055
|2
|4.4
|271
|598.6
|361
|797.3
|533
|1,177.3
|116
|256.2
|4,219
|9,318.6
|-
|Fort Rouge East
|9,235
|2
|4.3
|74
|160.3
|76
|164.6
|178
|385.5
|58
|125.6
|2,253
|4,879.3
|-
|Kirkfield Park
|10,920
|2
|3.7
|37
|67.8
|44
|80.6
|127
|232.6
|44
|80.6
|1,555
|2,848.0
|-
|West Inkster
|17,145
|3
|3.5
|97
|113.2
|71
|82.8
|165
|192.5
|53
|61.8
|3,808
|4,442.1
|-
|Fort Garry
|13,635
|2
|2.9
|111
|162.8
|193
|283.1
|290
|425.4
|81
|118.8
|4,410
|6,468.6
|-
|Fort Rouge West
|14,740
|2
|2.7
|164
|222.5
|128
|173.7
|234
|317.5
|91
|123.5
|6,077
|8,245.6
|-
|North Main
|7,885
|1
|2.5
|5
|12.7
|11
|27.9
|20
|50.7
|9
|22.8
|231
|585.9
|-
|North Kildonan
|16,735
|2
|2.4
|55
|65.7
|68
|81.3
|147
|175.7
|59
|70.5
|2,101
|2,510.9
|-
|Old Kildonan
|34,010
|4
|2.4
|219
|128.8
|223
|131.1
|533
|313.4
|187
|110.0
|6,403
|3,765.4
|-
|Fort Richmond
|17,395
|2
|2.3
|161
|185.1
|149
|171.3
|352
|404.7
|107
|123.0
|3,067
|3,526.3
|-
|South St. Vital
|11,410
|1
|1.8
|129
|226.1
|81
|142.0
|206
|361.1
|71
|124.5
|3,183
|5,579.3
|-
|Sargant-Minto
|11,900
|1
|1.7
|118
|198.3
|104
|174.8
|233
|391.6
|72
|121.0
|4,916
|8,262.2
|-
|East St. James
|12,110
|1
|1.7
|143
|236.2
|97
|160.2
|273
|450.9
|69
|114.0
|3,076
|5,080.1
|-
|East St. Boniface
|13,015
|1
|1.5
|54
|83.0
|66
|101.4
|180
|276.6
|49
|75.3
|1,929
|2,964.3
|-
|East Seine
|27,235
|2
|1.5
|39
|28.6
|52
|38.2
|114
|83.7
|54
|39.7
|2,692
|1,976.9
|-
|Waverly West
|28,865
|2
|1.4
|90
|62.4
|108
|74.8
|192
|133.0
|89
|61.7
|4,229
|2,930.2
|-
|West St. James
|15,055
|1
|1.3
|56
|74.4
|104
|138.2
|255
|338.8
|72
|95.6
|2,718
|3,610.8
|-
|Suburban Kildonan
|16,605
|1
|1.2
|71
|85.5
|106
|127.7
|195
|234.9
|72
|86.7
|2,747
|3,308.6
|-
|Assiniboia
|20,150
|1
|1.0
|187
|185.6
|127
|126.1
|348
|345.4
|117
|116.1
|3,950
|3,920.6
|-
|Charleswood
|24,990
|1
|0.8
|53
|42.4
|104
|83.2
|237
|189.7
|84
|67.2
|2,677
|2,142.5
|-
|North St. Vital
|27,170
|1
|0.7
|194
|142.8
|212
|156.1
|485
|357.0
|112
|82.4
|6,159
|4,533.7
|-
|East Kildonan
|30,710
|1
|0.7
|267
|173.9
|322
|209.7
|592
|385.5
|202
|131.6
|5,774
|3,760.3
|-
|River Heights
|20,650
|0
|0.0
|63
|61.0
|50
|48.4
|163
|157.9
|30
|29.1
|6,569
|6,362.2
|-
|Tuxedo
|7,855
|0
|0.0
|43
|109.5
|45
|114.6
|200
|509.2
|66
|168.0
|1,498
|3,814.1
|-
|Fort Whyte
|20,045
|0
|0.0
|41
|40.9
|23
|22.9
|73
|72.8
|49
|48.9
|2,680
|2,674.0
|-
|Transcona
|35,545
|0
|0.0
|268
|150.8
|229
|128.9
|562
|316.2
|186
|104.7
|8,605
|4,841.7
|-
|St. Norbert
|5,530
|0
|0.0
|9
|32.5
|23
|83.2
|60
|217.0
|17
|61.5
|663
|2,397.8
|-
|Dakota
|27,205
|0
|0.0
|32
|23.5
|27
|19.8
|111
|81.6
|49
|36.0
|2,102
|1,545.3
|-
|Garden City
|12,265
|0
|0.0
|145
|236.4
|66
|107.6
|208
|339.2
|73
|119.0
|4,205
|6,856.9
|-
|West Kildonan
|14,195
|0
|0.0
|131
|184.6
|189
|266.3
|535
|753.8
|115
|162.0
|3,477
|4,898.9
|-
|Dugald
|1,520
|0
|0.0
|7
|92.1
|6
|78.9
|23
|302.6
|10
|131.6
|312
|4,105.3
|-
|St. Boniface
|16,395
|0
|0.0
|266
|324.5
|233
|284.2
|494
|602.6
|150
|183.0
|7,761
|9,467.5
|-
| style="background: #fc3;" |Winnipeg
| style="background: #fc3;" |727,426 {{efn|group=2021crime|Note that the populations of each area added does not equal the population of Winnipeg here. This is because the areas use the 2016 Census, while the population here is an average of the 2016 and 2021 Census.|name=wpg}}
| style="background: #fc3;" |189| style="background: #fc3;" |5.2| style="background: #fc3;" |9,958| style="background: #fc3;" |273.8| style="background: #fc3;" |11,797| style="background: #fc3;" |324.3| style="background: #fc3;" |20,895| style="background: #fc3;" |574.5| style="background: #fc3;" |5,368| style="background: #fc3;" |147.6| style="background: #fc3;" |206,527| style="background: #fc3;" |5,678.3|}
The table below features all of the majorly residential neighborhoods of Winnipeg. It excludes neighborhoods that are majorly or entirely commercial, like Polo Park, Regent, Kildonan Crossing and the vast majority of Downtown. It also excludes neighborhoods that are majorly or entirely industrial, like St. James Industrial, Tuxedo Industrials and South Point Douglas. Finally, it also excludes neighborhoods that are majorly or entirely parks, like Kildonan Park and Assiniboine Park, though just because a neighborhood has "park" in its name does not mean the neighborhood is actually majorly a park in the same sense that just because a neighborhood has "lake" (ie: Island Lakes) in its name or "forest" (ie: Bridgewater Forest) in its name does not actually mean it's majorly a lake or a forest.

Some neighborhoods here are marked as being residential-commercial (res./com.), and this refers to the fact that some residential neighborhoods also have a large commercial or industrial area forming part of them. The consequence of this is that they will have somewhat inflated crime rates compared to typical residential neighborhoods because commercial and industrial zones are non-residential and thus these non-residential establishments can also be victims to crimes like robbery and theft, so essentially is extra crime occurring in non-residential areas of the neighborhoods that don't necessarily have any effect on the residential parts.

The table below features all of the majorly non-residential neighborhoods of Winnipeg, which includes things like shopping malls, parks, the airport and other commercial and industrial centers. There are no rates in this table because it is not appropriate to compare crime rates in residential areas with rates in industrial-commercial areas, as these areas are largely unpopulated with permanent residents when compared to how many people work there and how many people visit the area.

 Gangs and terrorism 

The Terrorism Research & Analysis Consortium has listed Winnipeg as one of Canada's "vulnerable cities" for terrorism.

By 1998, Winnipeg had garnered a reputation as the "gang capital" of Canada. Accordingly, the Canadian Police Association claimed in 2013 that gangs were "a key and distinguishing feature of the urban landscape in Winnipeg." In 2019, there were an estimated 4,000 local gang members in Winnipeg—around 1,500 full members and 2,500 associates—spread out between 25-30 separate gangs. This total number of members has remained roughly the same over the years, though the associated gang violence has grown.

In 2020, gangs were a significant driving force of violence in Winnipeg—with 50% of all 110 shootings and 30% of all 41 homicides that year being gang related.

Criminal organizations (active and inactive) based in Winnipeg include:

 Most notable groups: African/Afrikan Mafia, formed in 2005; Deuce (formerly The Over Lords, or TOL); Indian Posse, formed in 1988; Mad Cowz; MMM (Money Making Mali's); Manitoba Warriors (or 1323), formed in the 1990s;"Street Gangs in Winnipeg: Inner-City Youth Prevention Programs as Sites of Resistance?" Main Street Rattlers (defunct), formed in the 1980s; Most Organized Brothers (MOB); Native Syndicate, formed in the 1990s; Redd Alert, formed in the late 1990s;
 Other groups: 204 Girlz; 334 Mob Squad; All 'Bout Money (ABM), formed in 2008; Da Pitbull Army (DPA), formed in 2006; East Side Crips; Gangsta Crips; Good Squad; Junior Warriors; Krazies; Los Votos Chicanos; Noe Luv Crew; Nine O; North End Brotherhood; Renegades; Ruthless Crew; Sodiers; South Broadway Gang; Spade Bloods; Terror Squad; Terrorizer; TFN (Tax Free N*ggers); Transcona Guardian Angels; West End Boyz; and Westside Outlawz.

Local criminal cells in Winnipeg include Bandidos Motorcycle Club (Los Montoneros), who merged with Rock Machine in 2000; Bloods (Troublesum Bloodz, Westside Bloodz); Crips (East Side Crips, Westside Crips); Los Bravos, which turned into Manitoba's first Hells Angels chapter in 2000; and Triple M.

The 2004 film Stryker, directed by Noam Gonick, depicts gang violence in Winnipeg's North End.

 History 
In 1949, the Dew Drop Gang was formed only to disappeared in April the following year. Other than that, prior to the 1980s, Winnipeg did not have many street gangs.

It was autumn in 1993 when Winnipeg would see its first street gang-related murder: the stabbing of Chris Robichaud, over a pack of cigarettes, by an Indigenous youth nearby Grant Park Shopping Centre. In response, to address the prevalence of youth violence in Winnipeg, Manitoba Minister of Justice Rosemary Vodrey called an emergency violence summit to be held in December 1993.

In March 1993, the suspected leader for a gang based in Winnipeg's Maples area was arrested for uttering threats to school officials. This gang, which supposedly had 200 members around the city, was allegedly running a protection racket in the Seven Oake School Division. Winnipeg saw its first fatal gang-related drive-by shooting in July 1995, when 13-year-old Joseph "Beeper" Spence was shot in the back and killed outside a North End daycare centre. Spence was mistaken for an Indian Posse member by 8 members of the Deuce street gang. By May 1996, there were approximately 730 active street gang members, 75% of whom were Indigenous and 75% adults.

In 2020, gangs were a significant driving force of violence in Winnipeg—with 50% of all 110 shootings and 30% of all 41 homicides that year being gang related.

 Demographic-based gangs 
Winnipeg's gang activity consists of a number of demographics, primarily of Indigenous peoples, newcomers, and black Canadians, along with other ethnic groups, namely European and East Asian (Filipino and Vietnamese). Moreover, in 2001, the overwhelming majority of identified female gang members (between 60% to 98%) in Winnipeg were found to be "Aboriginal" (i.e., Indigenous). Nonetheless, poverty and homelessness are much greater indicators of gang involvement than race, as well as addiction, intergenerational trauma, broken families, and social isolation.

Ethnic-criminal organizations (active and inactive) centered in Winnipeg include:

 Indigenous gangs: Indian Posse, formed in 1988; Manitoba Warriors (or 1323), formed in the 1990s; Main Street Rattlers (defunct), formed in the 1980s;Most Organized Brothers (MOB); Native Syndicate, formed in the 1990s; Redd Alert, formed in the late 1990s; East Side Crips; Deuce (formerly The Over Lords, or TOL); Nine O; North End Brotherhood; Terror Squad; West End Boyz
 Black/African-Canadian gangs: African/Afrikan Mafia, formed in 2005; All 'Bout Money (ABM), formed in 2008; Da Pitbull Army (DPA), formed in 2006; Mad Cowz; MMM (Money Making Mali's); and TFN (Tax Free N*ggers)

Newcomers have been susceptible to fall into gang associations often due to the lack of access to resources and/or alienation in their new environment. The largest proportion of Winnipeg immigrant-gangs in 2013 was African-Canadian—around 35% (including the Mad Cowz and the African Mafia). One reason is that many newcomers come from especially violent backgrounds in war-torn countries (such as Somalia, Kenya, Congo). In early 2018, Winnipeg Police identified at least 2 gangs that were heavily recruiting immigrants.

The African Mafia, which was formed in 2005, is notoriously violent and has since splintered into other factions and regions. As late as 2019, Central Winnipeg is said to be a "stronghold" of Mad Cowz, with an additional presence of TFN and MMM, both gangs being splinters of the African Mafia. Recent shootings in the city are believed to be gang-related, including a fatal double homicide in 2019 in the Exchange District.

Formed in the early 1980s, the now-defunct Main Street Rattlers was the first Indigenous street gang in Winnipeg, chiefly operating as drug traffickers for biker gangs. About one year after the Rattlers' emerged, Asian gangs would begin to appear, engaging in much more serious violent crimes than other gangs of the time, such as extortion and armed robbery, mostly directed at the local Asian community. Around the end of the 1980s came the Vietnamese-Canadian "Halloween Gang", who were reportedly responsible for the 1988 murder of a teenage prostitute named Charlene Orsulak.

Indigenous gangs that followed the Rattlers were the Indian Posse in 1988 and the Manitoba Warriors in the 1990s, the latter beginning primarily as security on reserves and subsequently becoming a key player in the Winnipeg drug trade. The Native Syndicate would emerge soon after, as a prison gang at first.

By May 1996, there were approximately 730 active street gang members, 75% of whom were Indigenous and 75% adults.

In 2012—six years after it first caught the attention of Winnipeg Police Service (WPS)—WPS said the MOB had grown into a major criminal threat with over 100 documented members and associates. In 2008, the MOB began affiliating with the Manitoba Warriors, who would supply them drugs in exchange for committing violence on the Warriors' behalf. However, the two gangs have since become violent rivals.

 Crime in Manitoba 

In 2011, Manitoba had the highest violent crime rate and homicide rate of all Canadian provinces.

Among municipalities of Manitoba in the 2019 Violent Crime Severity Index (VCSI), Thompson ranked #1 out of 237 with a rating of 570 (the national average was 82.44). Its overall Crime Severity Index (CSI) rating came at 366 against the national average of 75.01. Portage la Prairie came at #3 with a CSI of 263 and VCSI of 316); Selkirk at #7 (CSI: 193; VCSI: 231); Winnipeg at #13 (CSI: 125; VCSI: 173); Brandon at #35 (CSI: 115; VCSI: 116); Steinbach at #79 (CSI: 87; VCSI: 80); and Winkler and Stanley at #140 (CSI: 54; VCSI: 52).

 Social services 
Organizations and initiatives in Winnipeg that serve at-risk, marginalized, and/or rehabilitation-seeking people include:

 Gang Action Interagency Network — a collection of government and non-profit agencies, community groups, and law enforcement officials who collaborate towards supporting gang members out of a criminal lifestyle and towards grassroots initiatives against gang activity.
 Immigrant and Refugee Community Organization of Manitoba — a non-profit agency for settling new Canadians.
 Ogijiita Pimatiswin Kinamatawin — a social service agency that works with at-risk Indigenous youth and adults.
 Rossbrook House — a neighbourhood drop-in centre active in Winnipeg's Centennial area, offering a safe space for children and young adults.
 Winnipeg Youth Gang Prevention Fund

 In pop culture 
Pop culture depictions of politics and/or crime in Winnipeg include:

 Stryker (2004), directed by Noam Gonick, is film that depicts gang violence in Winnipeg's North End.
 Seven Times Lucky (2004), directed by Gary Yates and starring Kevin Pollak, is a crime drama film centring on a con man involved in a criminal scam.
 Strike! (2005) is a stage musical set during the 1919 Winnipeg general strike. It was adapted into a film in 2019, titled Stand! and directed by Robert Adetuyi.
 Yoga Hosers (2016), directed by Kevin Smith.

See also
 List of mayors of Winnipeg
Canadian federal election results in Winnipeg
Death of Jaylene Redhead
If Day
Crime in Canada
Gangs in Canada

Notes

References

Further reading

 Comack, Elizabeth. 2012. Racialized Policing: Aboriginal People's Encounters with the Police. Halifax: Fernwood Publishing.
 Comack, Elizabeth, Lawrence Deane, Larry Morrissette, and Jim Silver. 2013. 'Indians Wear Red': Colonialism, Resistance, and Aboriginal Street Gangs. Halifax: Fernwood Publishing.

External links
 City of Winnipeg Crime Stat
 Police District Map
"City Hall." Winnipeg in Focus''. City of Winnipeg Archives.

 
Winnipeg
Winnipeg
Winnipeg